Malachy McGurran (1938 – 27 July 1978) was a leading Irish republican and founding member of the Northern Ireland Civil Rights Association, of which he was chairman.  

A native of Lurgan, County Armagh, McGurran joined Sinn Féin and the Irish Republican Army in 1955.  He was interned in the Curragh military barracks, near Dublin, from 1957 to 1959 during the IRA Border Campaign.

In 1969, at the time of the split in the Republican Movement, he became commander of the IRA in Northern Ireland, in an effort to head off the newly formed Provisional IRA. In 1970 he became Chairman of the executive of Republican Clubs (the name adopted by Sinn Féin in Northern Ireland after it was banned in 1964). He represented Official Sinn Féin on a speaking tour of the United States in the early 1970s when the party was trying to promote its case and separate itself in the public mind from the Provisional IRA.

In 1977 McGurran was elected for Craigavon 'A' which included the northern parts of Lurgan and the Loughside areas.  He polled over 5,000 votes (8.2% of the total) as a Republican Clubs candidate in the October 1974 Westminster general election. He unsuccessfully contested the 1975 Constitutional Convention election. 

Malachy McGurran was a Vice-President of Sinn Féin the Workers Party when he died of bone cancer aged 38 on 27 July 1978.

References

1938 births
1978 deaths
Deaths from bone cancer
Irish Marxists
Irish Republican Army (1922–1969) members
Irish republicans
Official Irish Republican Army members
People from Lurgan
Workers' Party (Ireland) politicians